Kurt Barlow is a fictional character and the main antagonist of Stephen King's 1975 horror novel 'Salem's Lot. The character is a powerful vampire who moves to the Maine town of Jerusalem's Lot with the intent to form a vampire colony of its residents. Due to his own predations as well as those of the residents he turns, the entire town is ultimately overrun by vampirism; only a few of the residents escape. Although his true age is unknown, he claims to be so old that he predates the founding of Christianity by centuries.

History

Salem's Lot
Before the events of the novel, it is suggested that Barlow's original name or alias was Breichen and that he was an Austrian nobleman. As Breichen, Barlow corresponded for twelve years with Hubert "Hubie" Marsten, a former Depression-era Boston hitman living in the town of Jerusalem's Lot, Maine, or "The Lot". Marsten murdered his wife and committed suicide, but not before burning his letters with Barlow. The novel strongly implies that Marsten entered into an agreement with Barlow that allowed him to eventually come to Jerusalem's Lot.

In 1975, Barlow arrives in Jerusalem's Lot in a box shipped overseas by his human assistant (or familiar), an Englishman named Richard Straker. The two take residence in Marsten's former mansion, which is considered haunted by almost everyone in town. Straker poses as an antiques dealer and opens a shop in town. He tends to the shop and handles business arrangements while Barlow is never seen in public, telling inquiring visitors that Barlow is frequently away on business. Straker kidnaps a local boy, Ralphie Glick, and makes a human sacrifice of the child in an appeasement ritual. Ralphie's brother, Danny, becomes Barlow’s first victim and begins to turn other locals.

Barlow makes his first appearance in the book when he encounters Dud Rogers, a hunchbacked dump custodian. Barlow also encounters Corey Bryant, a young telephone worker who has been tortured and ordered to leave town by Reggie Sawyer, the man Bryant was cuckolding. Knowing their desires, Barlow turns Rogers and Bryant.

Danny Glick later pays a night-time visit to one of his schoolmates, Mark Petrie. However, Mark, an intelligent and resourceful child, identifies Glick as a vampire and drives him off with a plastic cross. Mark sneaks into the Marsten House the next day with Susan Norton, intending to destroy Barlow. However, they are both captured by Straker; Susan is turned by Barlow and becomes a vampire, but Mark manages to escape, mortally wounding Straker in the process. Straker is later found hanging upside down, having been drained of his blood by Barlow. Petrie informs Susan's boyfriend, writer Ben Mears, of Susan's fate, and becomes part of the effort to destroy the town's vampires, together with Ben, the Catholic priest Father Callahan, doctor Jimmy Cody and the Lot's high school English teacher, Matt Burke.

When Father Callahan and Mark head over to Mark's parents to explain the danger that the family is in, the power is suddenly cut, and Barlow appears. He kills Mark's parents by smashing their heads together, but does not infect them. Barlow then takes Mark hostage briefly. Callahan pulls out his cross in an attempt to drive him off, and for a time it works, until Barlow challenges him to throw away the cross. Callahan, not having faith enough to do so, is overwhelmed by Barlow, who takes the now-useless cross and snaps it in two. Barlow then forces Callahan to drink his vampire blood, making him "unclean".

By now Mark has escaped, part of Barlow's deal with Callahan, and has fled to warn the others. At the end of the book, Barlow is destroyed by Ben Mears and Mark Petrie in the basement of Eva Miller's boarding house, whose residents have, like almost everyone else in the town, become vampires.

The town's locals remain vampires, even after the destruction of Barlow, and inevitably start to spread outside the town's limits into surrounding areas. Ben Mears and Mark Petrie flee the town, the only surviving members of the group which set out to stop Barlow and Straker. After recovering somewhat from the ordeal, they return a year later and set a brush fire near the Marsten House with the intent to burn down the town. The fire is intended to destroy as many vampires and their daylight hiding places as possible, as the beginning of an all-out effort by the two to destroy the vampire colony entirely.

The Dark Tower
In The Dark Tower series, it is revealed that Barlow is a Type One vampire, capable of hibernating for centuries and is highly intelligent and cunning. However, he seems to appear more human than the other Type One vampires when making his appearances in Salem's Lot. His appearance even seems to change toward the end of the novel into a younger-looking version of himself, de-aging from the older way he looked earlier in the novel. It is unknown if other Type One vampires can shift into a true human appearance like Barlow was able to do.

Adaptations

1979 miniseries
In Salem's Lot (1979), In the 1979 miniseries, he is depicted with a grotesque Nosferatu-like appearance. In The Dark Tower, it is mentioned in the beginning that "Type One" vampires (such as Barlow) are horribly disfigured, mutant-like creatures whose teeth grow out so wildly that they cannot close their mouths.  In addition, Kurt Barlow did not speak, and only communicated in growls, hisses and grunts.

This version of Barlow has a variety of supernatural powers, such as telekinesis; he opens a locked cell door with a wave of his hand, moves his own coffin along with the (unnaturally freezing cold) crate that it is inside, and causes the Petries' entire house to shake before entering.

1995 radio drama
In the 1995 BBC radio dramatization of 'Salem's Lot, Barlow was voiced by Doug Bradley.

2004 miniseries

In the 2004 miniseries adapted from the novel, Barlow is portrayed by Rutger Hauer. He is a sophisticated, well-dressed older gentleman and, at first glance, his only difference from the rest of the community is his mildly anachronistic appearance (his dress and behavior seem to come from an earlier time).

2023 film
In the 2023 film adaptation, Barlow is portrayed by Alexander Ward.

Straker
Richard Throckett Straker is Barlow's "familiar" or human thrall. All of Barlow's business concerns are enacted by him. He buys the Marsten house and prepares the way for his master. After Mark Petrie wounds Straker during his escape from the Marsten house, Straker is drained of his blood by Barlow who is unable to resist feeding on his servant's freshly spilled blood. Barlow is furious at this turn of events, as he considers Straker the best servant he ever possessed.

In Salem's Lot (1979), Straker was the main antagonist and a more prominent villain than Barlow, unlike the novel, and was alive until the climax of the miniseries. Though seemingly human, this version of Straker turns out to be something more with incredible strength, and it is implied he possesses some kind of supernatural power; he manages to summon a fast wind as he abducts Ralphie Glick in the woods and easily manages to lift Dr. Bill Norton off the ground by himself with little effort, as he impales him on a wall filled with animal horns. He was, however, still mortal and was shot and killed by Ben Mears on the stairs of the Marsten house, though he took several bullets to the abdomen and continued to move until finally succumbing to his wounds. Straker was English in this version (as played by James Mason) and came from London. His name, according to Constable Gillespie, was actually Richard K. Straker, though it remains unknown what the middle initial stood for.

In the BBC radio adaptation, Straker was played by John Moffatt.

In Salem's Lot (2004), Straker's name is once again changed, this time into Richard Thomas Straker. He was portrayed by Donald Sutherland. Although he again has more screen time than Barlow in this version, his role is somewhat reduced from that of the original miniseries. He is also never actually seen in any of the same scenes with Barlow. In this version, he is killed as in the novel and left hanging upside down from the rafters of the Marsten house, drained of his blood by Barlow.

References

'Salem's Lot
Characters in American novels of the 20th century
Literary characters introduced in 1975
Fictional characters who can move at superhuman speeds
Fictional characters with superhuman strength
Fictional murderers
Fictional vampires
Male literary villains
Stephen King characters